Hart is a city in Castro County, Texas, United States. The population was 1,114 at the 2010 census.

Geography

Hart is located in southeastern Castro County at  (34.386723, –102.115035), along Texas State Highway 194.

Demographics

2020 census

As of the 2020 United States census, there were 869 people, 313 households, and 249 families residing in the city.

2000 census
As of the census of 2000, there were 1,198 people, 371 households, and 304 families residing in the city. The population density was 1,594.5 people per square mile (616.7/km2). There were 410 housing units at an average density of 545.7 per square mile (211.1/km2). The racial makeup of the city was 60.93% White, 3.09% African American, 0.92% Native American, 0.08% Pacific Islander, 32.05% from other races, and 2.92% from two or more races. Hispanic or Latino of any race were 74.62% of the population.

There were 371 households, out of which 48.8% had children under the age of 18 living with them, 68.2% were married couples living together, 8.4% had a female householder with no husband present, and 17.8% were non-families. 15.9% of all households were made up of individuals, and 8.4% had someone living alone who was 65 years of age or older. The average household size was 3.23 and the average family size was 3.61.

In the city, the population was spread out, with 35.9% under the age of 18, 10.0% from 18 to 24, 25.0% from 25 to 44, 18.9% from 45 to 64, and 10.2% who were 65 years of age or older. The median age was 28 years. For every 100 females, there were 104.1 males. For every 100 females age 18 and over, there were 99.0 males.

The median income for a household in the city was $28,424, and the median income for a family was $28,681. Males had a median income of $23,594 versus $15,625 for females. The per capita income for the city was $9,960. About 14.7% of families and 17.1% of the population were below the poverty line, including 20.5% of those under age 18 and 21.1% of those age 65 or over.

Education
The city of Hart is served by the Hart Independent School District.

Climate
According to the Köppen Climate Classification system, Hart has a semi-arid climate, abbreviated "BSk" on climate maps.

Planetary Science 
A rare type of meteorite unique to the Western Hemisphere was discovered near Hart in March 2010. A field worker found a single, large, dense brownish stone weighing 966 grams beside a road located 0.25 miles from the town of Hart. The meteor was subsequently purchased by a collector. The stone was analyzed at the University of Washington and was classified as a Carbonaceous Chondrite (CK3), the most massive example of one of 25 known specimens in the world. The finding was published in The Meteoritical Bulletin, No. 101 (2013) MB 101 with the meteorite being given the official name of "Hart".

References

External links
 
 Hart, Texas from the Texas State Directory website.

Cities in Castro County, Texas
Cities in Texas